Jacob Breslow is an American academic who is currently the Associate Professor of Gender and Sexuality in the Department of Gender Studies at the London School of Economics. A former trustee of the transgender children's charity Mermaids, Breslow quit the organization in 2022 after it was revealed that he had spoken at a conference organized by B4U-ACT, a organization that provides support to paedophiles.

He has since been placed under investigation by the LSE. His resignation came as Mermaids was placed under investigation by the Charity Commission for alleged safeguarding failures.

He was previously a LSE Teaching Fellow in Transnational Sexuality and Gender.

Selected publications 

 Ambivalent Childhoods: Speculative Futures and the Psychic Life of the Child. University of Minnesota Press. 2021.

References 

American academics
Gender studies academics
Academics of the London School of Economics
Alumni of the London School of Economics
Year of birth missing (living people)
Living people